Fitzwilton is a privately held investment company, today owned by Sir Anthony O'Reilly and his brother in law, Peter Goulandris, through Stoneworth Investment Ltd.  It has been involved with many businesses in Ireland.

History
Fitzwilton was established by Tony O'Reilly with friends (Ferguson and Leonard) in the early 1970s. Over the years, the Company has been involved in numerous business activities ranging from textiles, to house construction, to fertiliser manufacturing, to bottling, to oil and gas investments, to supermarkets to light manufacturing. Taken private in the late 1990s in conjunction with his brother-in-law, the company is now involved in light manufacturing, property investments, financial services and architectural signage

1997-present

Northern Ireland deal
In June 1997 Fitzwilton signed a joint venture deal with Safeway plc which saw 15 of its Northern Irish Wellworths stores converted to Safeway outlets. The remaining Wellworths stores were sold to the Musgrave Group. Safeway's move into Northern Ireland followed that of J Sainsbury and Tesco; Sainsbury's announced its expansion into the province in 1995 and opened its first store in December 1996, while Tesco opened its first store in October 1996 and purchased Associated British Foods' Stewarts/Crazy Prices group in 1997. Fitzwilton objected to Sainsbury's planning applications on the grounds that authorities had "moved mountains" to allow the company's developments to proceed. Fitzwilton was successful in delaying Sainsbury's Coleraine store, but failed ultimately to prevent the development.

Taken private
Fitzwilton plc was de-listed from the stock exchange in 1998 when O'Reilly and Goulandris completed their takeover.

In July 2002 Safeway purchased Fitzwilton's 50% share of Safeway Stores (Ireland) for £45 million.

Till 2019
Fitzwilton's main residual business is Rennicks, a supplier of "road traffic management products", mostly metallic roadsigns but also owns Mobile Traffic Solutions, which sells and rents portable changeable message signs (PCMS) for which it holds exclusive marketing rights for Ireland and the UK.

References

External links
 Rennicks Homepage

Tony O'Reilly family
Goulandris family
Investment companies of the United Kingdom
Privately held companies of the United Kingdom